This is a list of cases reported in volume 290 of United States Reports, decided by the Supreme Court of the United States in 1933 and 1934.

Justices of the Supreme Court at the time of volume 290 U.S. 

The Supreme Court is established by Article III, Section 1 of the Constitution of the United States, which says: "The judicial Power of the United States, shall be vested in one supreme Court . . .". The size of the Court is not specified; the Constitution leaves it to Congress to set the number of justices. Under the Judiciary Act of 1789 Congress originally fixed the number of justices at six (one chief justice and five associate justices). Since 1789 Congress has varied the size of the Court from six to seven, nine, ten, and back to nine justices (always including one chief justice).

When the cases in volume 290 were decided the Court comprised the following nine members:

Notable Cases in 290 U.S.

Welch v. Helvering
In Welch v. Helvering,   290 U.S. 111 (1933), the Supreme Court ruled on the difference between business and personal expenses and the difference between ordinary business deductions and capital expenses. It is one of the most important income tax law cases.

Home Building and Loan Association v. Blaisdell
In Home Building and Loan Association v. Blaisdell,   290 U.S. 398 (1934), the Supreme Court held that Minnesota's suspension of creditors' remedies was not in violation of the Contract Clause of the United States Constitution. Blaisdell was decided during the depth of the Great Depression and has been criticized by modern conservative and libertarian commentators. In 1933, in response to a large number of home foreclosures, Minnesota, like many other states at the time, extended the time available for mortgagors to redeem their mortgages from foreclosure. The appellee owned a lot in Minneapolis that was in the foreclosure process. The extension had the effect of enlarging the mortgagor's estate contrary to the terms of the contract. The Supreme Court upheld the statute, reasoning that the emergency conditions created by the Great Depression "may justify the exercise of [the State's] continuing and dominant protective power notwithstanding interference with contracts." Blaisdell was the first time the court extended the emergency exception to purely economic emergencies. While Blaisdell itself might have been held to apply only in limited instances of economic emergency, by the late 1930s the emergency exception doctrine had expanded dramatically.

Federal court system 

Under the Judiciary Act of 1789 the federal court structure at the time comprised District Courts, which had general trial jurisdiction; Circuit Courts, which had mixed trial and appellate (from the US District Courts) jurisdiction; and the United States Supreme Court, which had appellate jurisdiction over the federal District and Circuit courts—and for certain issues over state courts. The Supreme Court also had limited original jurisdiction (i.e., in which cases could be filed directly with the Supreme Court without first having been heard by a lower federal or state court). There were one or more federal District Courts and/or Circuit Courts in each state, territory, or other geographical region.

The Judiciary Act of 1891 created the United States Courts of Appeals and reassigned the jurisdiction of most routine appeals from the district and circuit courts to these appellate courts. The Act created nine new courts that were originally known as the "United States Circuit Courts of Appeals." The new courts had jurisdiction over most appeals of lower court decisions. The Supreme Court could review either legal issues that a court of appeals certified or decisions of court of appeals by writ of certiorari. On January 1, 1912, the effective date of the Judicial Code of 1911, the old Circuit Courts were abolished, with their remaining trial court jurisdiction transferred to the U.S. District Courts.

List of cases in volume 290 U.S. 

[a] Sutherland took no part in the case
[b] Roberts took no part in the case

Notes and references

External links
  Case reports in volume 290 from Library of Congress
  Case reports in volume 290 from Court Listener
  Case reports in volume 290 from the Caselaw Access Project of Harvard Law School
  Case reports in volume 290 from Google Scholar
  Case reports in volume 290 from Justia
  Case reports in volume 290 from Open Jurist
 Website of the United States Supreme Court
 United States Courts website about the Supreme Court
 National Archives, Records of the Supreme Court of the United States
 American Bar Association, How Does the Supreme Court Work?
 The Supreme Court Historical Society